Tensairity is a trademarked term for a light weight structural concept that uses low pressure air to stabilize compression elements against buckling. It employs an ancient foundational splinting structure using inflated airbeams and attached stiffeners or cables that gains mechanical advantages for low mass. The structure modality has been particularly developed by Mauro Pedretti.

Known applications 
Bridges, band stand shells,, geodesic domes, aircraft wing construction, temporary shop and hospitality.

Related technology 

A related structure modality is tensegrity. Conceivably, an ultralightweight structure evacuated of air would float in the atmosphere, much as a buoy floats in water A crushing load is present destabilizing such structures. However, enclosed-air structures perhaps made of tensairity beams in a tensegrity format holding an enveloping skin could be heated by solar energy and interior activity and then become lighter than air, like hot-air balloons. A torus of 72 inch major diameter and 27 inch minor diameter displaces about 5 pounds of atmosphere, so if the torus weighed less than 5 pounds, and was evacuated, it would be buoyant. Buckminster Fuller designed floating cities (air-filled) so lightweight that they would be buoyant only by the effect of solar heat warming the air within to slightly less density than the surrounding air. As domes, they were about 1/2 mile diameter. As floating spheres, the cities would not experience earthquakes.

References 

Tensile architecture